Cotonopsis phuketensis is a species of sea snail, a marine gastropod mollusk in the family Columbellidae, the dove snails.

Description

Distribution
This species is distributed in the Andaman Sea along Thailand.

References

Columbellidae
Molluscs of the Indian Ocean
Gastropods described in 1998